Bjarke Christensen (born 26 January 1992) is a Danish handball player for KIF Kolding and the Danish national team.

He made his debut on the Danish national team on 17 March 2022, against Norway at the 2021-22 Golden League Tournament in Aalborg.

On 20 June 2021, it was announced that Christensen had signed a 3-year contract with KIF Kolding beginning from the summer of 2022. From the summer of 2024 he has a contract with Skjern Håndbold.

Achievements
Danish Handball League:  
Winner: 2018
Silver: 2015, 2017
Bronze: 2013, 2019
Danish Handball Cup:  
Winner: 2014, 2016 2021
Silver: 2012
 EHF Cup:
Bronze: 2015

References

External links

1992 births
Living people
Danish male handball players
People from Ringkøbing-Skjern Municipality
Sportspeople from the Central Denmark Region